Rampage is a 2018 American science fiction action adventure monster film directed by Brad Peyton and loosely based on the video game series of the same name by Midway Games, from a screenplay by Ryan Engle, Carlton Cuse, Ryan J. Condal and Adam Sztykiel. The film stars Dwayne Johnson in the lead role, Naomie Harris, Malin Åkerman, Jake Lacy, Joe Manganiello and Jeffrey Dean Morgan. It follows a primatologist who must team up with George, an albino western lowland gorilla who turns into a raging creature of enormous size and growing into bigger and larger sizes as a result of a rogue experiment, to stop two other mutated animals from destroying Chicago.

The film is the third collaboration between Peyton and Johnson, following Journey 2: The Mysterious Island (2012) and San Andreas (2015). It also marked the final released Warner Bros. film to be financed by Access Entertainment / RatPac-Dune Entertainment as the studio had ended their partnership with the company due to sexual harassment allegations against RatPac-Dune owner Brett Ratner (which resulted in the company going uncredited); the company subsequently dissolved later that year.

Principal photography began in April 2017 in Chicago. The film was released in the United States on April 13, 2018, by Warner Bros. Pictures, in 2D, RealD 3D and IMAX. The film had grossed over $428 million worldwide and received mixed reviews from critics, but positive reception from audience, with praise for its performances (particularly Johnson and Morgan), action sequences and visual effects, but criticism of its screenplay, pacing and storyline.

Plot

Athena-1, a space station owned by gene-manipulation company Energyne, is destroyed after a laboratory rat mutates and wreaks havoc. Kerry Atkins, the lone surviving crew member, manages to escape in the escape pod when the station implodes, along with pathogen canisters that Energyne CEO Claire Wyden orders her to retrieve, but the pod disintegrates upon re-entry, killing her and leaving a trail of debris across the United States. One canister is swallowed by an American crocodile in the Everglades and another lands in a Wyoming forest where a wolf is exposed to the pathogen.

Primatologist Davis Okoye, a former Special Forces soldier and member of an anti-poaching unit, works at the San Diego Wildlife Sanctuary. He has befriended a rare albino western lowland gorilla named George that he saved from poachers who killed his mother and communicates with him using sign language. One of the canisters crash-lands in George's habitat and he is exposed to the pathogen.

As George grows considerably larger and becomes more aggressive, Davis is contacted by genetic engineer Dr. Kate Caldwell, who explains that the pathogen was developed by Energyne to rewrite genes on a massive scale. She had hoped to advance research on CRISPR as a potential cure for diseases, but discovered Energyne's plans to use it as a biological weapon and was falsely incarcerated, during which her terminally ill brother died. George escapes from captivity and goes on a rampage at the preserve. George calms down, but is soon captured by a government team led by Agent Harvey Russell and put on a Boeing C-17 Globemaster III airplane. Meanwhile, Claire and her brother Brett oversee a mercenary team's attempt to capture the mutated wolf, Ralph, which goes awry, and the entire team is slaughtered.

Claire, hoping to capture Ralph and use George to cover up her plot, uses a massive transmitter atop the Willis Tower to lure the animals – engineered to respond aggressively to a certain radio frequency – to Chicago, unconcerned about the massive risk to civilian lives this poses. George reacts violently to the sound and crashes the plane, though Davis, Kate, and Russell parachute to safety. George survives the crash and joins Ralph as they make their way to Chicago, while Davis and Kate are aided by Russell in stealing a military helicopter in pursuit.

They arrive to find George and Ralph rampaging through the city as the military struggles to contain them. The situation worsens when the mutated crocodile, Lizzie, joins the duo, causing even more casualties. Planning to steal an antidote to turn the animals back to normal, Davis and Kate infiltrate Energyne's base of operations at the tower and take several vials of it, but are caught by the Wydens as Claire reveals that the antidote only eliminates the animals' enhanced aggressiveness rather than reversing the other effects and shoots Davis, but he survives. When George climbs to the top of the tower, Claire orders Davis to distract it while she attempts to escape with Kate at gunpoint. Kate slips a vial into Claire's handbag and pushes her toward George, who devours the terrorist along with the vial, returning him to his normal personality. Down below, Russell takes incriminating evidence from Brett, who is crushed to death by falling debris. As the damaged tower topples, Davis and Kate survive by crash-landing a helicopter on the Federal Plaza.

Davis stays to help George defeat the other animals, while Kate and Russell rush to prevent the military from deploying a MOAB against them. George battles against Ralph, whom Davis tricks into advancing towards Lizzie, who decapitates him using her jaws. Lizzie chases Davis, but George intervenes in time for Davis to incapacitate her using grenades. However, Lizzie survives and overpowers George, who is impaled by a rebar. Davis distracts Lizzie using a fallen Apache attack helicopter, but is nearly killed before George pierces Lizzie through the eye with the same rebar, killing her.

With the threat neutralized, the airstrike is aborted. In the aftermath, George and Davis, joined by Kate and Russell, help clear the city of debris and rescue civilians.

Cast

Humans

 Dwayne Johnson as Davis Okoye, a former US Army Special Forces soldier as well as primatologist and head of an anti-poaching unit.
 Naomie Harris as Katherine "Kate" Caldwell, a disgraced genetic engineer who teams up with Okoye.
 Malin Åkerman as Claire Wyden, the CEO of Energyne, the company responsible for the pathogen that caused George, Lizzie and Ralph's mutations.
 Jeffrey Dean Morgan as Harvey Russell, a government agent who works for the "Other Government Agency".
 Jake Lacy as Brett Wyden, Claire's dimwitted brother.
 Joe Manganiello as Burke, the leader of a private military group.
 Marley Shelton as Kerry Atkins, a scientist and astronaut.
 P. J. Byrne as Nelson, a scientist and friend of Okoye.
 Demetrius Grosse as Colonel Blake
 Jack Quaid as Connor
 Breanne Hill as Amy
 Matt Gerald as Zammit
 Will Yun Lee as Agent Park
 Urijah Faber as Garrick

Gorillas
 Jason Liles as the motion-capture performance for George, an albino western lowland gorilla (comparable to Snowflake) raised and trained by Okoye. George becomes one of the animals affected by Energyne's pathogen that increases their sizes and turns and mutates them into giant rampaging monsters.
 Skye Notary and Willow Notary as the motion-capture of a pair of female gorillas who also live in George's habitat.
 Vincent Roxburgh as the motion-capture of Paavo, a young male gorilla who lives in George's habitat (uncredited).

Production

Development
Warner Bros. acquired the film adaptation rights to the 1986 arcade game Rampage in 2009, as part of their acquisition of Midway Games for $33 million. The project was announced in November 2011, with John Rickard set as a producer. Rickard said that he decided to work on the movie by searching the list of titles to which Warner held the adapting rights and, upon finding Rampage, remembering playing the arcade game. In June 2015, Dwayne Johnson was set to star, re-teaming with New Line and producer Beau Flynn, while the studio was looking for a director to start production in mid-2016. Johnson mentioned that he loved the game as a child, playing the arcade game in a pool hall and later owning it on the Nintendo Entertainment System. During the search for a script, writers offered many takes, including a faithful one to the game where the monsters were mutated humans, before the producers settled on the one by Ryan Engle, who aimed to make a "love letter to the monster movies I grew up watching", such as Jaws and Jurassic Park, while making it clear that the animals were not the heroes.

After Dwayne Johnson was cast, in July, Brad Peyton went to direct and produce. Peyton later described the film to "be a lot more emotional, a lot scarier and a lot more real than you'd expect". Between January and July 2017, the rest of the supporting cast was assembled.

Filming
Principal photography on the film began on April 17, 2017, in Chicago, Illinois. The film also was shot in Atlanta, Georgia.

Easter eggs to the original game were featured, as Energyne's offices have a Rampage arcade machine, George eats a person who he pulls out of a building he punched, and Claire is devoured while wearing a red dress, just as the woman featured in the arcade's opening screen.

Visual effects
The visual effects were primarily provided by Weta Digital. Effects supervisor Erik Winquist and a small crew travelled to Chicago to create a model of the Chicago Loop that would be destroyed in the climactic battle, learning the building materials and architecture styles. Up to 15,000 photographs were taken with 3D scanners, while motion cameras covered downtown Chicago. As reference for the building destruction, the artists studied both the World Trade Center collapse from 2001 and implosions of buildings affected by the 2016 Kaikoura earthquake in Weta's hometown of Wellington. One of the more challenging aspects for Weta was figuring out how the weight and mass of the monsters would affect the city environment and destruction.

Given Weta had plenty of experience creating animated apes in King Kong and Rise of the Planet of the Apes and its sequels Dawn and War, it helped the studio create George "in a much shorter time than it may have 10 years ago", according to Winquist. Motion capture coach Terry Notary even took a break from Avengers: Infinity War, which was also filmed in Atlanta, to help Jason Liles in his performance as George. On the other hand, the lack of motion capture for Ralph and Lizzie let the animators go loose with how these monsters were portrayed, such as "a wolf that has porcupine spines and wings".

Other VFX companies like Hydraulx, Scanline VFX and UPP contributed to the film.

Music

The music was composed by Andrew Lockington. The film marked Lockington's fourth collaboration with director Brad Peyton. An exclusive track was also released by Kid Cudi titled "The Rage" which plays in the film's end credits. The soundtrack was released digitally on April 13, 2018, by WaterTower Music.

Marketing

As part of the promotion, three new games were made available: one is a browser game called Rampage: City Smash; another an arcade beat 'em up playing more as a redemption game, was made available at Dave & Buster's; and a free VR game called Project Rampage VR.

Release

Theatrical
Rampage was released on April 13, 2018, in 3D and IMAX, by Warner Bros. Pictures, after initially being set for release a week later, on April 20. The release date was moved up after Avengers: Infinity War had also shifted its release up by a week, to April 27, so as to provide Rampage with a two-week cushion. The film was coincidentally released 3 weeks after Pacific Rim Uprising, another American  film.

Home media
Rampage was released on Digital HD on June 26, 2018, and on 4K UHD, Blu-ray 3D, Blu-ray and DVD on July 17, 2018. To date, Rampage has sold $28.7 million worth of DVDs and Blu-rays in North America.

Reception

Box office
Rampage grossed $101 million in the United States and Canada and $327 million in other territories for a worldwide total of $428 million against a production budget of $120 million plus another $140 million for the marketing budget. Deadline Hollywood reported that the film was likely to break even two years after its release after accounting for all revenue streams.

In the United States and Canada, Rampage was released alongside the openings of Truth or Dare and Sgt. Stubby: An American Hero, as well as the wide expansion of Isle of Dogs, and was projected to gross $35–40 million from 3,950 theaters in its opening weekend. The film made $11.5 million on its first day (including $2.4 million from Thursday night previews), $13.9 million on Saturday, and a total of $35.7 million over the weekend, finishing first at the box office. Like many films starring Johnson, the audience demographics were diverse, with 43% being Caucasian, 21% Hispanic, 19% African American, and 14% Asian. The film dropped 41% in its sophomore weekend to $21 million, finishing second behind A Quiet Place, which was in its third week. In its third weekend, the film fell 64% to $7.1 million, finishing fourth. It fell 35% in its fourth weekend, grossing $4.6 million and finishing fifth. In its fifth weekend, it fell just 27% and grossed $3.3 million and finished seventh.

Critical response
The website's critical consensus reads: "Rampage isn't as fun as its source material, but the movie's sheer button-mashing abandon might satisfy audiences in the mood for a brainless blockbuster." It became the best-reviewed live-action video game film in the history of the site until the release of Pokémon Detective Pikachu the following year. On Metacritic, the film has a weighted average score of 45 out of 100, based on 46 critics, indicating "mixed or average reviews". Audiences polled by CinemaScore gave the film an average grade of "A−" on an A+ to F scale, while PostTrak reported adult and children filmgoers gave it respective overall positive scores of 90% and 86%.

Varietys Peter Debruge gave the film a moderately positive review, saying: "However derivative it may be, Rampage knows its audience—namely, Transformers fans and kids born after 9/11 for whom elaborately orchestrated scenes of falling skyscrapers carry nary a whiff of real-world trauma.... What director Peyton lacks in artistic vision he compensates for in his ability to wrangle such a CG-intensive production". Brian Tallerico of RogerEbert.com gave the film 2.5/4 stars, and wrote that "when Johnson is doing that movie action star thing he does so well and giant animals are going enormous-mano-a-enormous-mano, there’s undeniably goofy fun to be had. You just have to be patient during the downtime". The Mir Fantastiki review gave the movie 7/10, claiming it's a stupid movie, but one that's good at what it's supposed to be, and honest about not being any more than that.

Michael Phillips of the Chicago Tribune gave the film 1.5 out of 4 stars, reviewing: "Rampage is a drag. Three times during the thing, I wrote down the phrase 'NO FUN', with increasingly impatient underlines". In an article for The Hollywood Reporter, Nick Allen wrote about what he called the film's "disastrous" tone, saying that "despite the Rampage arcade cabinets being constantly visible in its villains’ headquarters, director Brad Peyton's live-action adaptation comes off as too emotionally glib and mean-spirited, even for a mega-budget B-movie".

Empire described it as quintessential Johnson project: "it sounds like a dreadful basis for a movie. And it sort of is, but it’s also sort of a lot of fun". Empire notes that the film is not as tongue-in-cheek as viewers might expect, concluding that "Rampage is big dumb fun, but not as big, dumb and fun as it could have been".

Accolades
Rampage was nominated for three Teen Choice Awards, in the category Choice Sci-Fi Movie, and for the acting performances of Dwayne Johnson (Choice Sci-Fi Movie Actor) and Naomie Harris (Choice Sci-Fi Movie Actress).

Director Brad Peyton was asked if the rat in the beginning of the film was based on "Larry" from the Atari Lynx port of the original game. Peyton responded: "We didn't name him Larry, but I'm going to use that, if there is a sequel, I'm going to make the rat's name Larry". The film was also speculated to be a prequel to The Walking Dead television series because of the similarities between Negan and Harvey Russell, both of whom are played by Jeffrey Dean Morgan.

Lawsuit allegations
In late March 2018, German director Uwe Boll, famous for his movie adaptations of video games, threatened to file a lawsuit against Warner Bros. if the studio did not change the film's title. Boll, who produced and directed an unrelated Rampage film trilogy, about a spree killing revolutionary who shares Boll's political views, claimed that the Warner Bros. film would "shrink" his brand and revenues he could use for future installments of his Rampage films. He also went on to say that the Warner Bros. film "confuses the audience" and is "one of those typical feelgood, popcorn movies..." As of 2023, Boll has not sued.

Potential sequel
In July 2017, Dwayne Johnson discussed the potential for a sequel and offered an appearance role to Mike Matei. By April 2018, director Brad Peyton stated that he was open to returning as director for a potential sequel, while confirming that a concept for the project's story is mapped out. Johnson referred to his repeated works with Peyton as his director, stating that he enjoys working with the filmmaker from a creative standpoint and looks forward to future collaborations. Reports from insiders later stated that a sequel is indeed in development, with some stating that Johnson intends to complete a trilogy of films. In December 2021, Hiram Garcia confirmed that Warner Bros. Pictures wants a sequel, while Seven Bucks Productions delayed development in favor of other projects.

See also
 List of films based on video games
 List of films featuring space stations
 Planet of the Apes franchise

References

External links

 
 

2018 films
2018 3D films
2010s action adventure films
2010s monster movies
American 3D films
Kaiju films
American action adventure films
American monster movies
Dune Entertainment films
2010s English-language films
Films about gorillas
Films about crocodilians
Films about size change
Films about wolves
Films directed by Brad Peyton
Films produced by Beau Flynn
Films scored by Andrew Lockington
Films set in San Diego
Films set in Los Angeles
Films set in Chicago
Films set in Florida
Films set in Wyoming
Films set in Colorado
Films set in Africa
Films set in South Dakota
Films set in Missouri
Films set on airplanes
Films shot in Chicago
Films using motion capture
Films with screenplays by Carlton Cuse
Giant monster films
Live-action films based on video games
New Line Cinema films
Rampage (franchise)
Seven Bucks Productions films
Warner Bros. films
2010s American films
2010s Japanese films